Gochev (masculine) or Gocheva (feminine) is a Bulgarian surname. Notable people with the surname include:

Miroslav Gochev (born 1973), Bulgarian sport wrestler
Rumiana Gocheva (born 1957), Bulgarian chess player
Rusi Gochev (born 1958), Bulgarian footballer

See also
Karolina Gočeva (born 1980), Macedonian singer

Bulgarian-language surnames